Pakistan Council for Science and Technology (PCST) is a government owned advisory council responsible for policy making, planning, implementation and carrying out policy studies of science and technology. It is also mandated to advise the federal government on development of fields of science and technology in Pakistan. PCST also act as the secretariat of National Commission of Science and Technology (NCST), chaired by the Prime Minister of Pakistan. It's constitution was approved by National Assembly of Pakistan in an act called, The Pakistan Council for Science and Technology Act, 2016.

Structure 
Pakistan Council for Science and Technology, usually compromises of following members.

President 
Minister for Science and Technology

Vice President 
Secreretary, Science and Technology Division

Members 
 Secretary, Planning and Development Division or his nominee
 Secretary, Finance Division or his nominee
 Executive Director Higher Educatron Commission
 Secretary of the Division controlling subject matter of education and training (or his nominee)
 President, Pakistan Academy of Sciences (or his nominee)
 Chairman. Pakistan Engineering Council
 Chairman, Pakistan Council of Scientific and Industrial Research
 Chairman, Pakistan Science Foundation
 Representatives of provincial govemments
 Five eminent scientists from academia, one each from four provinces and federal capital
 Two eminent industrialists to be nominated by the Federal Government
 President, Federation of Pakistan Chamber of Commerce and Industries, Islamabad
 Dealing officer (not below the rank of Joint Secretary of the Division controlling the subject matter of science and technology)
 Two parliamentarians, one each from Senate and National Assembly.
 Chairperson, Pakistan Council for Science and Technology

See also 
 Pakistan Council of Scientific & Industrial Research

References

External links 
 Official website

Science and technology think tanks
Science and technology in Pakistan
Scientific organisations based in Pakistan
Pakistan federal departments and agencies